Talwar Gallery is a contemporary Indian art gallery. Founded by Deepak Talwar, it opened in New York City in September 2001 and in New Delhi in 2007.

Overview
Talwar Gallery, New York was launched in September 2001 and Talwar New Delhi opened in 2007. Deepak Talwar, founder of Talwar Gallery, has been working with contemporary artists from India since 1996.
Representing some of the most exciting artists working in the Indian subcontinent today and the essential 20th century artists from India like Estate of Rummana Hussain and Nasreen Mohamedi, Talwar Gallery is a contemporary art gallery focusing on artists from the Indian Subcontinent and its Diaspora. Underlying the gallery vision is the belief that the artist is geographically located not the art. Their search and their work traverse any simplified categorization based on geography, religion, culture or race.

Talwar New York
Since opening in September 2001, Talwar Gallery NY has presented first solo exhibitions of artists that have since been focus of museum exhibitions and collections. Talwar presented the first solo exhibition in the US of Nasreen Mohamedi (1937–90) in 2003. It was the first solo exhibition of Mohamedi outside India and the first ever of her photographs, and Talwar presented Mohamedi again in 2008 and 2013 in solo exhibitions. The Metropolitan Museum of Art (MET) in New York presented Mohamedi’s work as their inaugural solo exhibition at The MET Breuer in 2016.  Talwar NY also presented the first solo exhibition in the US of Ranjani Shettar in 2004. Shettar since then has been subject of solo exhibitions at ICA Boston (2008), The Modern Art Museum, Fort Worth, TX (2008), The San Francisco Museum of Modern Art (2009), The Metropolitan Museum of Art, New York (2018),  The Phillips Collection, Washington DC (2019). Amongst other artists introduced by Talwar to the western audiences include Rummana Hussain, Alwar Balasubramaniam, Allan deSouza, Rummana Hussain, Alia Syed, Anjum Singh, Arpita Singh, Muhanned Cader, N. N. Rimzon , Kartik Sood, and Sheila Makhijani.

Exhibitions

New York Exhibitions 
 2019  Alwar Balasubramaniam, Becoming Nature
 Alia Syed, Meta Incognita: Missive II
 2018  Arpita Singh, Trying down time II
 Ranjani Shettar, On and on it goes on
 Shambhavi Singh, Maati.Maa
 2017  Arpita Singh, Tying down time
 Allan de Souza, Through the Black Country & Alia Syed, On a wing and a prayer
 2016  N. N. Rimzon, And I thank you one again
 Alwar Balasubramaniam, Rain in the midnight
 Rummana Hussain, Breaking skin
 2015  Sheila Makhijani, NowNotNow
 Anjum Singh, Masquerade
 Allan de Souza, Notes from Afar
 Muhanned Cader, Jungle Tide
 2014  Ranjani Shettar, Night skies and daydreams
 Paramjit Singh, Shifting Terrains
 Nasreen Mohamedi, Becoming One
 2013  FOUND
 Alia Syed, Panopticon Letters: Missive I
 Alwar Balasubramniam
 2012  Rummana Hussain
 2011  Shambhavi Singh, Lonely Furrow
 Allan de Souza, Trysts Tropicales
 Sheila Makhijani, TOSS
 2010  Alia Syed, Wallpaper
 2010  Risham Syed, and the rest is history
 Ranjani Shettar 
 2009  Emperor’s New Clothes
 Excerpts from Diary Pages
 Nasreen Mohamedi, the grid, unplugged
 2008  Alia Syed, New Films & Photoworks
 Allan de Souza, (I don’t care what you say) Those Are Not Tourist Photos
 2007  Alwar Balasubramaniam
 Valsan Kolleri,  New Clearage: Retrospective as Artwork
 Shambavi Singh, a bird and two thousand echoes, Paintings 2001-2006
 2006  Anant Joshi, Local, Kiss Me Kill Me – Push Me Pull Me 
 Ranjani Shettar, Recent Works
 2005  Navjot Altaf, Water Weaving
 Sheila Makhijani, BLIP!
 Allan de Souza, The Lost Pictures
 Alwar Balasubramaniam, Into Thin Air
 2004  Paramjit Singh, Recent Paintings
 Ranjani Shettar, The Indian Spring
 Sheila Makhijani, Recent Works 
 Alia Syed, Eating Grass 
 2003  Nasreen Mohamedi, Photoworks
 Allan de Souza, people in white houses
 Navjot Altaf, In Response To…, 
 Alia Syed, Film Works, 
 2002  Anjum Singh, New Paintings,
 South Asian Women’s Creative Collective, MANGO,
 Alwar Balasubramaniam, Recent Works
 Subba Ghosh & Sheila Makhijani
 Rajendra Dhawan & Paramjit Singh, Inner/Outer, 
 2001  Allan de Souza, Recent Works
 Zarina Bhimji, Cleaning the Garden

New Delhi Exhibitions 
 2019  Anjum Singh, I am still here::Sheila Makhijani, This That and The Other
 2018  Alwar Balasubramaniam, Liquid Lake Mountain
 2017  Ranjani Shettar, Bubble trap and a double bow
 2016  Muhanned Cader, ISLAND
 N.N. Rimzon, Forest of The Living Divine
 2015  Rummana Hussain, Breaking Skin
 Alwar Balasubramaniam, layers of wind, lines of time
 Shambhavi Singh, Reaper’s Melody
 2014  Ranjani Shettar, Between the sky and earth
 Navjot Altaf, Horn in the Head
 2013  Sheila Makhijani, nothing really to know
 Allan deSouza, Painting Redux
 2012  Alwar Balasubramaniam, Nothing From My Hands
 2011  Ranjani Shettar, Present Continuous
 2010  Rummana Hussain, Fortitude From Fragments
 Navjot Altaf, Touch IV
 2009  Alwar Balasubramaniam, (IN)BETWEEN
 Alia Syed, Elision
 2008  Allan deSouza, A Decade of Photoworks
 Shambhavi Singh, Lullaby
 2007  Ranjani Shettar, Epiphanies:Alwar Balasubramaniam, (in)visible

Other exhibitions

 2019 Rummana Hussain in Our time for a future sharing, India Pavilion, 58th Venice Biennale, Italy
 Ranjani Shettar, Earth Songs for a Night Sky, The Phillips Collection, Washington DC
 Arpita Singh, Arpita Singh: A Retrospective, Kiran Nadar Museum of Art, New Delhi, India
 Alia Syed in Migrating Worlds: The Art of the Moving Image in Britain, Yale Center for British Art, New Haven, CT
 Alwar Balasubramaniam in Alchemy: Explorations in Indigo, Arvind Indigo Museum, Ahmedabad, India
 2018  Allan deSouza, Through the Black County, Krannert Art Museum, Champaign, IL
 Alwar Balasubramaniam in You Remind Me of Someone, FRAC Lorraine, Metz, France
 Ranjani Shettar, Seven ponds a few raindrops, The Metropolitan Museum of Art, New York, NY
 2017  Allan deSouza in Lucid Dreams and Distant Visions: South Asian Art in the Diaspora, Asia Society, New York, NY, 2017.
 N.N. Rimzon in Pond Near the Field, Kiran Nadar Museum of Art, New Delhi, India
 2016  Alia Syed & Allan deSouza in Contents Under Pressure, Van Every/Smith Museum Galleries, Davidson, NC
 Nasreen Mohamedi, MET Breuer, The Metropolitan Museum of Art, New York, NY
 2015  Nasreen Mohamedi, Museo Nacional Centro de Arte Reina Sofía, Madrid, Spain
 Shelia Makhijani in Working Spaces, Kiran Nadar Museum of Art, New Delhi, India
 Alwar Balasubramaniam & Allan deSouza in Intersections @5, Works from the permanent collection, The Phillips Collection, Washington DC
 Allan deSouza in Time / Image, Blaffer Art Museum, Houston, TX
 2014  Allan deSouza in Earth Matters, Smithsonian Institution, National Museum of African Art, Washington, DC and Fowler Museum, Los Angeles, CA
Rummana Hussain in The Sahmat Collective: Art and Activism in India since 1989, Smart Museum of Art, Chicago, IL and Ackland Art Museum, Chapel Hill, NC
 Nasreen Mohamedi in Abstract Drawing, Drawing Room, London, UK
 Nasreen Mohamedi in Lines, Hauser & Wirth, Zurich, Switzerland
 Nasreen Mohamedi, Tate Liverpool, UK
 Rummana Hussain in Is it what you think? Kiran Nadar Museum of Art, New Delhi, India
 2013  Alia Syed & Ranjani Shettar in 5th Moscow Biennale of Contemporary Art, Moscow, Russia
 Nasreen Mohamedi, A Retrospective, Kiran Nadar Museum of Art, New Delhi, India
 Ranjani Shettar, High tide for a blue moon, Dr. Bhau Daji Lad Museum, Mumbai, India 
 Ranjani Shettar in Now Here is also Nowhere: Part 1, Henry Art Gallery, Seattle, WA
 Alia Syed, Eating Grass, Los Angeles County Museum of Art, Los Angeles, CA
 2012  Sheila Makhijani in 7th Asia Pacific Triennial of Contemporary Art, Gallery of Modern Art and Queensland Art Gallery, Brisbane, Australia
 2012 Alwar Balasubramaniam, all our relations, 18th Biennale of Sydney Australia
 Nasreen Mohamedi in Lines of Thought, Parasol unit foundation for contemporary art, London, UK
 Ranjani Shettar, Dewdrops and Sunshine, National Gallery of Victoria, Melbourne, Australia
 2011  Alwar Balasubramaniam, Sk(in), The Phillips Collection, Washington, DC 
 Alwar Balasubramaniam in Beyond the Self, National Portrait Gallery, Canberra, Australia 
 Allan deSouza, The World Series, The Phillips Collection, Washington, DC
 Ranjani Shettar in Flame of The Forest, Hermes Foundation, Singapore
 Nasreen Mohamedi, A. Balasubramaniam, Sheila Makhijani, Alia Syed & Ranjani Shettar in On Line: Drawing Through the Twentieth Century, The Museum of Modern Art (MoMA), New York, NY

Source:

Publications 
2019: Arpita Singh, Tying down time, text by Ella Datta and Deepak Talwar
 
2017: Ranjani Shettar, Between the sky and earth, text by Catherine deZegher, Ranjani Shettar, Deepak Talwar, Talwar Gallery

2009: Nasreen Mohamedi, the grid, unplugged, text by Geeta Kapur, Deepak Talwar, Anders Kreuger, John Yau, Talwar Gallery

2009: Alwar Balasubramaniam, (In)between, text by Deepak Talwar, Talwar Gallery

2008: Allan deSouza, A Decade of Photoworks, texts by Allan deSouza, Eve Oishi, Moi Tsien, Luis Francia, Steven Nelson, Talwar Gallery

2005: Nasreen Mohamedi, Lines Among Lines, Drawing Papers 52, texts by Geeta Kapur, Susette Min, Drawing Center

2005: (Desi)re, Talwar Gallery, 2005

References

External links
 
Talwar Gallery, New Delhi on India Express
Talwar Gallery on Artinfo
Talwar Gallery, New Delhi on ArtSlant
Talwar Gallery, New York on ArtSlant

Art museums and galleries in India
Art museums and galleries in Manhattan
Art galleries established in 2001
2001 establishments in New York City